Shadow Puppets or Shadow Puppet can refer to:
 A synonym for shadow play
 Shadow Puppets, the 2002 novel by Orson Scott Card
 Shadow Puppets (film),  2007 horror film
 Spike: Shadow Puppets, a comic book based on the Buffy the Vampire Slayer and Angel television series
 "Shadow Puppets" (The Walking Dead: World Beyond), an episode of the first season of The Walking Dead: World Beyond
 The Shadow Puppet, a 2014 translation of Georges Simenon's novel L'Ombre chinoise

See also
 The Last Shadow Puppets, a British rock band